Universalism refers to religious, theological, and philosophical concepts with universal application or applicability. Universalists may emphasise the universal principles of most religions. 

Universalism may also refer to:

Religion
 Universalism, a theological and philosophical concept that some ideas have universal application or applicability
 Universism, a religion created by Vidkun Quisling
 Christian universalism is a school of Christian theology which includes the belief in the doctrine of universal reconciliation. 
 History of Christian universalism is the doctrine that all sinful and alienated human souls will ultimately be reconciled to God.
 Trinitarian universalism is a variant of belief in universal reconciliation, the belief that every person will be saved, that also held the Christian belief in Trinitarianism.
 An American denomination that merged into Unitarian Universalism

Philosophy
 Universality (philosophy) 
 Moral universalism
 Open individualism, American philosopher Arnold Zuboff refers to this concept as "universalism".
 Universalizability, philosophy of Kant

Politics
 Universal monarchy
 A name used by the Dark Enlightenment for secular humanism and progressivism

Music
 "Universal Religion", a compilation album series within the Armin van Buuren discography

See also
 Universal (disambiguation)
 Universality (disambiguation)
 Universal church (disambiguation)

Universalism